Cuisine of Rome may refer to:

 Ancient Roman cuisine, the food, drink and eating traditions of the ancient Romans
 Roman cuisine, the food, traditional dishes and eating habits in the modern city of Rome